The Rosa 'Pope John Paul II' is a white Hybrid tea rose  cultivar, developed by Jackson & Perkins in honor of Pope John Paul II.

History
'Pope John Paul II' was created by American rose breeder, Dr. Keith W. Zary  in 2006, and was introduced into the United States in 2013 by Jackson & Perkins. The new rose was created in honor of the late Pope John Paul II. The  pure white rose was specifically chosen by the Vatican, and was planted in the Vatican gardens in 2013 overlooking Saint Peter's Basilica.

The Pope John Paul II rose was included in the White House Rose Garden during the latest renovations by First Lady Melania Trump in honor of the first time a pope visited the White House in 1979.

Description
'Pope John Paul II' is a medium-tall upright shrub, 4 to 5 ft (121-152 cm) in height with a 2 to 3 ft (60-91 cm) spread. The shrub produces over 45 large petals that are a luminous, white, and 5-6  in (12-15  cm) in diameter. Flowers have a strong, citrus fragrance. 'Pope John Paul II' is disease resistant and has dark green foliage.

See also
Garden roses
Rose Hall of Fame
List of Award of Garden Merit roses

References

Pope John Paul II
Products introduced in 2013